The Portuguese National Time Trial Championships have been held since 1996.

Multiple winners

Men

Women

Men

Women

See also
Portuguese National Road Race Championships
National road cycling championships

References

National road cycling championships
Cycle races in Portugal
Recurring sporting events established in 1996
1996 establishments in Portugal